Yoan Miguel Aybar (born July 3, 1997) is a Dominican professional baseball pitcher who is currently a free agent. Before 2018, he played as an outfielder.

Career

Boston Red Sox
Aybar was initially an outfielder in the farm system of the Boston Red Sox, primarily playing as a center fielder. In 2014, for the Dominican Summer League Red Sox, he batted .271 with 26 RBIs in 56 games. He played for the Gulf Coast League Red Sox in 2015, batting .268 with 16 RBIs in 45 games. In 2016, he played for the Lowell Spinners, recording three home runs and 19 RBIs with a .207 average in 60 games. Aybar spent 2017 playing for Lowell and the Greenville Drive, appearing in 80 games total while batting .230 with two home runs and 32 RBIs.

In 2018, Aybar converted to pitching. During 2018, with the Gulf Coast League Red Sox and Lowell Spinners, he appeared in 17 games (all in relief) compiling a 4.13 ERA and 2–1 record with 27 strikeouts in  innings pitched. In 2019, for the Greenville Drive and Class A-Advanced Salem Red Sox, Aybar had a 4.61 ERA and 1–3 record while striking out 70 batters in  innings in 44 relief appearances.

The Red Sox added Aybar to their 40-man roster after the 2019 season. He was optioned to Class A-Advanced Salem on March 8, 2020. Aybar did not play in a game in 2020 due to the cancellation of the minor league season because of the COVID-19 pandemic.

Colorado Rockies
On December 3, 2020, Aybar was traded to the Colorado Rockies in exchange for minor-league infielder Christian Koss. On March 18, 2022, Aybar was designated for assignment by the Rockies.

Chicago White Sox
On March 20, 2022, Aybar was claimed off waivers by the New York Yankees. However, Aybar was then waived by the Yankees and claimed off of waivers by the Chicago White Sox on March 24.  He was sent outright on August 18, 2022. He elected free agency on November 10, 2022.

References

1997 births
Living people
Baseball pitchers
Dominican Republic expatriate baseball players in the United States
Dominican Summer League Red Sox players
Greenville Drive players
Gulf Coast Red Sox players
Lowell Spinners players
People from Baní
Peoria Javelinas players
Salem Red Sox players